This article is about the particular significance of the year 1736 to Wales and its people.

Incumbents

Lord Lieutenant of North Wales (Lord Lieutenant of Anglesey, Caernarvonshire, Flintshire, Merionethshire, Montgomeryshire) – George Cholmondeley, 3rd Earl of Cholmondeley 
Lord Lieutenant of Glamorgan – Charles Powlett, 3rd Duke of Bolton
Lord Lieutenant of Brecknockshire and Lord Lieutenant of Monmouthshire – Thomas Morgan
Lord Lieutenant of Cardiganshire – John Vaughan, 2nd Viscount Lisburne
Lord Lieutenant of Carmarthenshire – vacant until 1755
Lord Lieutenant of Denbighshire – Sir Robert Salusbury Cotton, 3rd Baronet 
Lord Lieutenant of Pembrokeshire – Sir Arthur Owen, 3rd Baronet
Lord Lieutenant of Radnorshire – James Brydges, 1st Duke of Chandos

Bishop of Bangor – Charles Cecil
Bishop of Llandaff – John Harris 
Bishop of St Asaph – Isaac Maddox (from 4 July)
Bishop of St Davids – Nicholas Clagett

Events
17 April - Frederick, Prince of Wales, marries Princess Augusta of Saxe-Gotha at the Chapel Royal in St James's Palace, London.
4 July - Isaac Maddox is consecrated Bishop of St Asaph. Maddox continues to reside in south-east England and rarely visits the diocese.
28 July - John Harris, Bishop of Llandaff, becomes Dean of Wells Cathedral in succession to Isaac Maddox.
Thomas Frye paints the Prince of Wales for the Worshipful Company of Saddlers. 
date unknown
Sixty soldiers are drowned after their vessel is wrecked on the Wolves rocks near Flat Holm; the incident leads to the building of a lighthouse on the island.
Howell Harris opens a school.
Fortunatus Wright marries Mary, daughter of William Bulkeley, in Dublin.

Arts and literature

New books
Rees Ellis - "A Summer Carol"
Anthony Ellys - A Plea for the Sacramental Test as best Security for the Church established, and very conducive to the Welfare of the State
John Reynolds - Heraldry Displayed

Births
6 July - Daniel Morgan, American pioneer, soldier and politician, of Welsh ancestry (d. 1802)
10 July - David Jones, Church of England priest and an early supporter of Welsh Calvinistic Methodism (d. 1810)
31 August - David Ellis, clergyman, poet and transcriber of manuscripts (d. 1795)
22 October - John Thomas, Anglican priest and antiquarian (d. 1769)
date unknown
Charles Morgan, politician (d. 1787)
Thomas Wynn, 1st Baron Newborough, politician (d. 1807)

Deaths
June - Edward Prideaux Gwyn, about 38 
November? - Griffith Wynn, translator, about 76
22 November - Thomas Lewis, politician, owner of The Van estate, 56/57
date unknown - Edward Kemys, MP for Monmouth Boroughs, about 43

References

1736 by country
1736 in Great Britain